Nevertheless, is a 2021 South Korean television series starring Han So-hee, Song Kang, and Chae Jong-hyeop. Based on a popular webtoon of the same name which was first published on Naver Webtoon, it tells the story of two people who are attracted to each other but are skeptical about love, owing to their past relationships. It aired on JTBC's Saturdays at 23:00 (KST) time slot from June 19 to August 21, 2021. Each episode was released on Netflix in South Korea and internationally after its television broadcast.

Synopsis
An uncertain romance begins between Yoo Na-bi, a heartbroken woman who no longer believes in love, and Park Jae-eon, a flirtatious man who does not want to commit to a relationship.

Cast

Main
 Han So-hee as Yoo Na-bi, a student at Hongseo University's Sculpture Department who has given up on love but still wants to go out on dates. Due to a cruel experience with her ex-boyfriend, she no longer believes in destiny and has vowed never to fall in love again.
 Song Kang as Park Jae-eon, a student at Hongseo University's Sculpture Department who thinks relationships are a bother but likes to flirt. He is kind and friendly to everyone but is actually uninterested in other people. He is an expert in playing hard to get and does not show his true feelings.
 Chae Jong-hyeop as Yang Do-hyeok, Na-bi's childhood friend whose first love is her. He runs a popular cooking show on YouTube.
 Lee Yul-eum as Yoon Seol-ah, Jae-eon's middle school classmate and ex-girlfriend.
 Yang Hye-ji as Oh Bit-na, Na-bi's best friend.

Supporting
 Kim Min-gwi as Nam Gyu-hyun, Bit-na's best friend.
 Lee Ho-jung as Yoon Sol, Ji-wan's best friend.
 Yoon Seo-ah as Seo Ji-wan, Sol's best friend.
 Jung Jae-kwang as Ahn Kyung-joon, Jae-eon and Na-bi's senior.

Extended
 Han Eu-ddeum as Min-young, a teaching assistant of the Sculpture Department.
 Yoon Sa-bong as Jung Sook-eun, Na-bi's aunt who raised her as a daughter.
 Seo Hye-won as Jang Se-young, Na-bi's department junior.
 Lee Seung-hyub as Joo Hyuk
 Kim Moo-jun as Yoo Se-hoon
 Yoo Ji-hyun as Yoon-ji
 Son Bo-seung as Min-sang, a senior member of the social group of art students.
 Seo Bum-june as Hwang Jin-soo
 Lee Jung-ha as Kim Eun-han
 Jin Ho-eun as Seo Ji-wan's friend

Special appearances
 Choi Sung-jae as Yoo Hyeon-woo, Na-bi's ex-boyfriend.
 Ha Do-kwon as the older brother of Jae-eon's ex-girlfriend.
 Go Won-hee as a woman at the bar
 Seo Jeong-yeon as Jae-eon's mother

Production
 The first script reading of the cast was held on March 5, 2021 and filming began the same month. Filming continued for about four months and wrapped up on July 6 in Seoul.
 On June 3, 2021, it was revealed that some episodes of the series were in discussion to air under rated 19.
 In July 2021, actor Kim Min-gwi was embroiled in a controversy when an article about his personal life was posted on an online community. Because of this, JTBC announced on the 28th that his appearance on Nevertheless would be edited out as much as possible from episode 8.

Original soundtrack

Part 1

Part 2

Part 3

Part 4

Part 5

Part 6

Part 7

Part 8

Ratings

References

External links
  
 Nevertheless at Naver Webtoon 
 Nevertheless at Line Webtoon
 
 
 

JTBC television dramas
2021 South Korean television series debuts
2021 South Korean television series endings
South Korean romance television series
South Korean college television series
Television shows based on South Korean webtoons
Television series by Studio N (Naver)
Television series by JTBC Studios
Korean-language Netflix exclusive international distribution programming
2020s college television series